Gumaca, officially the Municipality of Gumaca,  is a 1st class municipality in the province of Quezon, Philippines. According to the 2020 census, it has a population of 71,942 people.

It is located at the mouth of what is now known as Pipisik River and nestled at the foot of the Sierra Madre range. The town is widely known as a heritage town due to the many ancestral houses and old structures that abound in the area, including a fortress from the Spanish era. The local government is currently conserving these heritage structures for future generations.

History
Formerly known as Bumaka (meaning "the one who fought"), the present town of Gumaca was a settlement founded at the southern bank of Palanas River in the 14th century by a group of settlers from Borneo and the Malay Peninsula. It is in fact only 11 years younger than the “Noble and Ever Loyal City of Manila”.

The earliest known ruler was Lakan Bugtali. His sovereignty extended over the regions bordering Gusuan, now called Lamon Bay, from Gamao point to the North, to the island across the bay or now known as Alabat Islands, to the south-west passing the north-eastern part of the present town of Calauag, the source of Talolong, which traverses the town of Lopez, and Pandanan Rivers and on the north-west as far as the upper Kalilayan River. Thus when the first Spaniards arrived in this settlement in 1574 led by Fr. Diego de Oropesa, they found a group of barangays with their own culture and government. Gumaca, writes Juan Álvarez Guerra in Viajes por Filipinas: De Manila á Tayabas (2nd printing 1887), is first mentioned in the Franciscan register of 1582. This is the same year given by Huerta (1862). Fray Diego belonged to the batch of pioneering Franciscans under Juan de Plasencia who were assigned to explore the area presently the provinces of Rizal, Laguna and Quezon to determine future mission sites for the Franciscans. They introduced Christianity to the people with San Diego de Alcala being proclaimed as the pueblo's patron saint. In 1582, the first “visita” was erected and 1686 marked the establishment of a full-pledged town with independent (civil) government, the earlier ones having been headed by the ever-present Spanish friars (The municipality boasts of a still complete line-up of chief executives from 1574 to the present.).

From 1574 to 1670 the town of Gumaca was ruled by Spanish friars. Then from 1671 to 1893 the town was ruled by Spanish and Filipino Gobernadorcillos. From 1893 to 1900 the town executives came to be known as Capitan Municipal and from 1901 the head of the town was elected by the people and came to be known as Presidente Municipal. Later in 1936 this title was changed to Municipal Mayor.

The brief history of Gumaca had no mention of any law, decree or Republic Act which created the municipality and there was no mother municipality where Gumaca came from. As for its daughter towns, Lopez is the most notable among them, being one of the largest and the most progressive in that part of the province.

From the early 1980s to the 1990s, there were calls to rename the town as Tañada, after nationalist and past Senator Lorenzo Tañada, with his son Wigberto Tañada proposing to have a poll once elected congressman of Quezon's fourth district; the renaming eventually did not push through.

Geography

Barangays
Gumaca is politically subdivided into 59 barangays:

Climate

Demographics

Economy

Transportation

By land
The municipality is connected with Manila by the Pan-Philippine Highway and daily rail services to and from Naga & Legazpi are provided by the Philippine National Railways.

In order to spur development in the municipality, The Toll Regulatory Board declared Toll Road 5 the extension of South Luzon Expressway. A 420-kilometer, four lane expressway starting from the terminal point of the now under construction SLEX Toll Road 4 at Barangay Mayao, Lucena City in Quezon to Matnog, Sorsogon, near the Matnog Ferry Terminal. On August 25, 2020, San Miguel Corporation announced that they will invest the project which will reduce travel time from Lucena to Matnog from 9 hours to 5.5 hours.

Another expressway that will serve Gumaca is the Quezon-Bicol Expressway (QuBEx), which will link between Lucena and San Fernando, Camarines Sur.

Tourism

San Diego de Alcala Fortress (Kutang San Diego)

Recognized by the National Historical Commission as a national treasure since 1981, this fortress was constructed by the Spaniards under the leadership of Franciscan priest Fray Francisco Coste. It was erected to help guard the town against pirates attacking from Lamon Bay, as well as from Dutch intruders during the 1700s. One can see some of the cannons still intact at the fort. According to some accounts, there used to be an existing tunnel between said fortress and the San Diego de Alcala Church, now a cathedral. Access was through a well located at the fort's platform, which is now covered. There are four fortresses constructed by the Spaniards, but only this one survived. It is a well-loved and famous landmark; it is included in the town's seal. Locals call the fortress kastilyo. There have been proposals to reconstruct the three other fortresses that were destroyed. The revival of the three forestresses would complete the original design of the four fortification ensemble of Gumaca, one of the most important fortification ensemble in the region during the Spanish era.

Lamon Bay

Known before as Gusuan Bay, Lamon Bay is named after Lam Ong, a pirate that was killed by Gumaca's earliest ruler, Lakan Bugtali. It is a body of water connecting the northern part of Quezon to the Pacific Ocean. It bounds the coastal towns of Atimonan, Gumaca, Plaridel, Lopez, and Calauag, and the islands of Alabat. It is a rich fishing ground and the home of various living corals. Most parts of the bay consist of gray sand, some parts are filled with rocks, and other living corals. It is gradually sloping to the extent that, during low tide, the water level is low enough to allow one to walk as far as five hundred meters from the shore.

The beaches in the towns of Gumaca and Plaridel are sandy and ideal for swimming, especially, during the months of April and May (caution though during the latter part of May when jellyfishes start arriving). In some parts of the bay, about ten feet from the beach front, are living corals. The town of Lopez has the best colonies of corals which are located just about 15 minutes by boat from the shore. Lamon Bay is located at the northern part of Quezon.

San Diego de Alcala Cathedral

The San Diego de Alcala Cathedral is the seat of the Diocese of Gumaca and is considered as the largest cathedral in Quezon, founded as early as 1582 as a visita by the Franciscan friars. The cathedral is under the patronage of Saint Didacus of Alcala (San Diego in Spanish). He was born to a poor couple in San Nicolas del Puerto and was given to a hermit as a young child. He joined the Order of Friars Minor (more popular known as the Franciscans) which is a group advocating the simple, contemplative and self-sacrificing lifestyle of Saint Francis de Assisi. While Saint Didacus was assigned in the infirmary of the convent of Ara Coeli, many of the patients were miraculously cured upon his divine intercession. His final assignment was in Santa Maria de Jesus in Alcala where he lived a life of penance, solitude and contemplation. He died on November 12, 1463, due to abscess in Alcala (thus the name San Diego de Alcala). Instead of foul odor, his body emitted a fragrant smell and rigor mortis did not set in. He was canonized in 1588. His feast was made November 13 instead of November 12 in order to give way to Saint Martin. However, in 1969, his feast was correctly made November 12 after the feast of Saint Martin was moved to April 13.

Plaza Rizal
Dedicated to the national hero José Rizal, the park and monument were built in 1935 during the incumbency of Eriberto Caparros. By 1982, it was modernized, renovated, and lighted. It is located at Barangay Rizal in the town's poblacion. It features Rizal standing on a pedestal. Three women are seated at the base representing the three major island regions of the country; Luzon, Visayas, and Mindanao. The women are wearing native costumes from the regions they represent.

Muralla
Gumaca, being a coastal town, was originally a walled city. Old maps dating to the Spanish era shows that the coastline from the mouth of Pipisik River running a few hundred meters is a muralla or wall, made up of stone (most probably coral stones and/or bricks) and hardwood. There are no extant remnants of it, except for the San Diego de Alcala Fortress that is used to be a part of the wall. However, the boulevard is still called by the locals as muralla. A large part of the sea was reclaimed, and is now fashioned like the Baywalk of Manila Bay. Landscaped, lighted, and beautified by the local government, it is now a favorite place of Gumaqueños to hang out, play, bask in the cool ocean breeze, or watch the sun set. There are some stores and a bar located along the strip; drinking along the boulevard is however prohibited.

Culture

Araña't Baluarte Festival 

The festival is celebrated every 15 May, in honor of San Isidro Labrador, the patron saint of farmers. This is also a thanksgiving feast for the bountiful harvest given to the farmers every year. Being an agricultural town, this is one of the most extravagant and well-attended festival of the town. The name means chandeliers (araña) and bastion or fort (baluarte). This festival is different from Pahiyas in Lucban – instead of houses being decorated with local produce, baluartes are decorated with various agricultural products like bananas, vegetables, buco, pineapple, and root crops; some are beautifully arranged in arañas. These crop decor are pulled out by the people after the patron saint has passed during the afternoon procession. The three most beautifully decorated baluartes are given prizes. At night, programs are held which includes a pageant aptly called "Mutya ng Araña't Baluarte", folk dances performed by students, teachers, and local townsfolk who would like to participate in the event.

Cultural tour 
Quezon is a tapestry of old Spanish-style houses with Castilian architecture and character. Visit the old houses of Lucban, Tayabas, Sariaya, Gumaca, and Mauban while savoring the best of the yield from lanzones plantations. Or come during the San Isidro Festival in honor of the patron of farmers, San Isidro Labrador. Take home petered rice paste strung in garlands for a souvenir and celebrate with the people this feat of thanksgiving for a bountiful harvest.

Folk dances 
Two (2) of our Folk Dances have originated in the Municipality of Gumaca: Jota Gumaqueña and Jotabal

Jota Gumaqueña was very popular among the well-to-do families of Gumaca,Tayabas (now Quezon). In formal social gatherings, the girls attired in richly embroidered Maria Clara costume and the boys in elegant Barong Tagalog, performed this dance with great dignity and elegance. According to information, the one who introduced this dance was a well-known musician of the place, a Señor Herminigildo Omaña. It became popular among the young people of the time and it has been handled down to generation. Mrs. Rosario Caparros Libranda and Mr. Ricardo Libranda who are the direct descendants of Mr.Omaña are responsible for the perpetuation of this beautiful dance.

Jotabal is derived from the words 'Jota' and 'Valse'. Jota is a popular dance introduced in the Philippines by the Spaniards. Valse means waltz, a step or a dance in 3/4 time. This lively festival dance originated in Camohaguin, Gumaca, Quezon (formerly Tayabas).

Government

 Mayor:  Webster Letargo

Municipal mayors

From the discovery in 1574 and official foundation of Gumaca in 1582, Franciscan Friars have been the Town Heads:
 Sr. Padre Diego de Oropesa (1574–1587) 
 Sr. Padre Esteban Ortiz (1588–1598) 
 Sr. Padre Geronimo Monte (1599–1622) 
 Sr. Padre Gabriel Santo Tomas (1623–1637) 
 Sr. Padre Marcelo de la Guardia (1638–1661) 
 Sr. Padre Celestino de San Miguel (1662–1670)

From 1671, Gobernadorcillos are the Heads of Town dof Gumaca (Spanish period): 
(Mostly composed of Dynasties of Hispanic-Filipino Families)
 Don Diego Jose (1671–1672) 
 Don Francisco Santa Maria (1673–1676) 
 Don Pedro De Castro (1677–1679) 
 Don Simon Prada (1680–1681) 
 Don Mariano De Dios (1682) 
 Don Jose San Agustin (1683) 
 Don Santiago Abra (1684) 
 Don Felix Gimenos (1684–1685) 
 Don Juan Adriano (1686) 
 Don Antonio Lopez (1686) 
 Don Juan San Buenaventura (1687–1688) 
 Don Jose Ajan de Vera (1689) 
 Don Buenaventura dela Cruz (1690) 
 Don Diego Martinez Polintan (1690) 
 Don Manuel Cuello (1691) 
 Don Don Gregorio Dandan (1692) 
 Don Nicolas Sarmiento (1693) 
 Don Francisco de Victoria (1694) 
 Don Francisco Martinez (1695–1696) 
 Don Juan Cabig (1697) 
 Don Gaspar Catapang (1698) 
 Don Francisco Escobar (1698–1699) 
 Don Marcos Frias (1700) 
 Don Pedro Talavera (1701) 
 Don Francisco Martinez (1702) 
 Don Diego Martinez Polonio (1703) 
 Don Diego Salvador (1704) 
 Don Francisco Cortez (1705) 
 Don Antonio Santa Maria (1706) 
 Don Pedro Talavera (1707) 
 Don Francisco de Victoria (1708) 
 Don Diego Martinez Polonio (1709) 
 Don Pedro Talavera (1710) 
 Don Buenaventura Delos Santos (1711)
 Don Francisco Clemente (1712) 
 Don Juan Bautista (1712)
 Don Francisco Salvador Martinez (1713) 
 Don Alejo Alonzo de Victoria (1714) 
 Don Antonio Catapang (1715) 
 Don Pedro Gimenes (1716) 
 Don Francisco Clemente (1717) 
 Don Geronimo Gimenes (1718) 
 Don Pedro Almonte (1719) 
 Don Pedro Patilo (1720) 
 Don Santiago Martinez (1721) 
 Don Bartolome Dandan Casadia (1722) 
 Don Pedro Talavera (1723) 
 Don Antonio Peras Margas (1724) 
 Don Jose Pagayanon (1724–1725) 
 Don Francisco de Victoria (1725–1727) 
 Don Francisco Salvador (1728) 
 Don Gregorio Gimenes (1729) 
 Don Francisco Cordero (1730) 
 Don Juan de Reyes (1731) 
 Don Eugenio delos Santos (1732–1733) 
 Don Francisco delos Reyes (1734) 
 Don Francisco De Leon (1735) 
 Don Andres Martinez (1736) 
 Don Diego delos Santos (1737) 
 Don Miguel delos Reyes (1738)

Presidentes Municipal (American period)
 Don Donato T. Arcaya (1901–1903) (First elected Presidente Municipal de Gumaca) Gobernadrocillo Interim (1900) 
 Don Carlos Capisonda (1904–1905)
 Don Rafael Castro (1906–1907)
 Don Conrado Oliveros (1908–1909)
 Don Tomas Tañada, Sr. (1909–1912)
 Don Aurelio P. Nava (1912–1916) Son of Gobernadorcillo Don Antonino Nava 
 Don Deogracias Tañada (1916–1919)
 Don Panfilo M. Tañada (1919–1923)
 Don Valeriano Arcaya (1923–1925) Son of Presidente Don Donato Arcaya 
 Don Marciano Linay Principe (1925–1928)
 Don Don Eriberto Caparros (1928–1931)
 Don Francisco Omaña (1931–1934) 
 Don Vicente M. Mendoza (1934–1939)

Japanese Occupation (1942–1946) 
 Sr. Juan R. Tañada (1940–1946)
 Don Vicente D. Victoria (1946–1951) Son of Gobernadorcillo Don Pedro Victoria
After the Liberation, the Head of Town has been changed to Municipal Mayor: 
 Sr. Mariano M. Tañada, Sr. (1952–1959) Son of Gobernadorcillo Don Vicente Tañada
 Dr. Cesar A. Angulo (1960–1963) 
 Don Tomas C. Tañada, Jr. (1964–1967) Son of Presidente Don Tomas Tañada, Sr.

Martial Law Era: (1972–1981): 
 Engr. Teodosio V. Principe (1968–1979) Son of Presidente Don Marciano Principe 
 Col. Robert T. Yap-Diangco (1980–1986)

After EDSA People Power I: (1986): 
 Cirilo M. Tañada (1986–1995) Son of Mayor Mariano M. Tañada, Sr.
 Col. Rodolfo B. Caralian (7/1/1995-8/16/1995) Died during his term of office 
 Juanito B. Bañal (1995–2007) 
 Engr. Joy Job Arcaya Cabangon (2007–2010)
 Engr. Erwin P. Caralian (2010–2019) Son of Mayor Col. Rodolfo Caralian
 Webster Letargo (2019 present)

References

External links

Gumaca Profile at PhilAtlas.com
[ Philippine Standard Geographic Code]
Philippine Census Information
Local Governance Performance Management System 

Municipalities of Quezon